The 2012 Autobacs Super GT Series was the twentieth season of the Japan Automobile Federation Super GT Championship including the All Japan Grand Touring Car Championship (JGTC) era and the eighth season as the Super GT series. It also marked the thirtieth season of a JAF-sanctioned sports car racing championship dating back to the All Japan Sports Prototype Championship. The season began on April 1 and ended on November 18, 2012, after eight championship races and a non-championship race.

Masataka Yanagida and Ronnie Quintarelli of Nissan works team MOLA won their second consecutive GT500 Drivers' and Teams' Championships, and became only the second team and driver combination to win the GT500 championship before the final round of the season. Team Taisan Endless and drivers Kyosuke Mineo and Naoki Yokomizo won the GT300 championships in their new Porsche 911 GT3-R, giving Team Taisan their final Super GT championship.

Schedule

Regulation changes 
From this season, the GT300 class fully incorporated the Group GT3 ruleset and Balance of Performance parameters used by the SRO Motorsports Group. Sixteen GT300 entries that competed in all or most domestic rounds were GT3 vehicles. GT3 vehicles won every championship round, plus both races of the non-championship Fuji Sprint Cup, along with the series championship.

2012 saw the introduction of hybrid powertrain vehicles to the GT300 category. Constructor apr introduced a Toyota Prius JAF-GT300 vehicle powered by a battery-driven hybrid system, and Mugen (M-TEC) followed shortly after by introducing the Honda CR-Z GT300 with a racing hybrid system developed by Zytek. Vehicles from the JAF-GT Category C (vehicles based on modified sports cars with minimal production requirements) and Category D (prototype cars not belonging to other JAF-GT categories) were phased out beginning in 2012. These outgoing vehicles included the Mooncraft Shiden, ASL Garaiya, and Vemac RD320R, which had been mainstays of the series for much of the past decade. On the other hand, JAF-GT Category A and B cars, based on mass production models, were allowed to use traction control beginning in 2012, and were also given concessions such as 14-inch width tyres, paddle sequential shifters, and larger diameter air restrictors.

Drivers and teams

GT500

GT300

Entrant Changes

GT500 Class 

 Nissan: Two-time GT500 champion Michael Krumm replaced 2008 champion Benoît Tréluyer at NISMO. Tréluyer left the Japanese circuit in order to drive full-time for Audi in the new FIA World Endurance Championship, while Krumm had returned after competing in the FIA GT1 World Championship.
 Lexus: 2010 champion Loïc Duval transferred out of Honda to join Lexus at Team Petronas TOM's, replacing André Lotterer, who left the series in order to drive full-time for Audi in the FIA World Endurance Championship. Within the Lexus camp, three-time series champion Juichi Wakisaka transferred to Lexus Team SARD, and André Couto transferred to Lexus Team WedsSport Bandoh. Yuji Kunimoto and Andrea Caldarelli each made their GT500 debuts, forming an all-rookie lineup at Lexus Team KeePer Kraft.
 Honda: 2008 All-Japan Formula 3 champion Carlo Van Dam made his full-time GT500 debut, replacing Duval at Weider Honda Racing. Ralph Firman returned to ARTA after a year away from racing in Japan.

GT300 Class 

 Reigning champions Goodsmile Racing & Studie with Team UKYO expanded to a two-car operation with the BMW Z4 GT3. Last year's championship-winning entry changed its number to 0, and championship winning driver Nobuteru Taniguchi was joined by former Lexus GT500 driver Tatsuya Kataoka. Co-champion Taku Bamba moved to the new number 4 car, joined by Masahiro Sasaki, who drove for GSR in 2010.
 NDDP (Nissan Driver Development Program) Racing entered the series with the all-new Nissan GT-R NISMO GT3. The team was managed by Masahiro Hasemi, and carried the number 3 which was associated with Hasemi Motor Sports, who competed in the series until 2010. Reigning All-Japan Formula 3 champion Yuhi Sekiguchi, and All-Japan F3 National Class champion Katsumasa Chiyo, were the team's drivers.
 SHIFT, the team managed by former GT500 champion Hironori Takeuchi, re-entered the series with the all-new Mercedes-Benz SLS AMG GT3. The team competed under the banner of Green Tec & LEON with Shift, with Takeuchi and former Team Mach driver Haruki Kurosawa as their drivers.
 Subaru and Subaru Tecnica International (STI) launched the BRZ GT300. The BRZ GT300 was entered by R&D Sport, who raced with the Legacy B4 between 2009 and 2011.
 apr introduced the hybrid-powered Toyota Prius GT to replace their previous Corolla Axio GT model. The number 31 Prius was driven by Morio Nitta and Koki Saga. apr also fielded a second entry with an Audi R8 LMS Ultra, driven by Yuki Iwasaki and Yuya Sakamoto (of Tokyo).
 M-TEC (as Team Mugen) would return to the series as an independent team, and introduced the hybrid-powered Honda CR-Z GT300, beginning from the fourth round at Sportsland Sugo. GT500 race winner Hideki Mutoh, and second-generation rookie driver Daisuke Nakajima were announced as Mugen's drivers.
 Gainer changed vehicles from the Ferrari 458 GTC to the new Audi R8 LMS Ultra, and consolidated their programme into a single-car entry.
 Hankook KTR, who entered a second car in select races in 2011, consolidated their programme into a single-car entry, their number 33 Porsche 911 GT3-R (Type 997) driven by Masami Kageyama and Tomonobu Fujii.
 Hitotsuyama Racing returned to the series for the first time since 2009, fielding two Audi R8 LMS. Their primary entry, number 21, was prepared by Nova Engineering, and driven by Akihiro Tsuzuki (who transferred from Samurai Team Tsuchiya) and rookie Cyndie Allemann, who became the first woman to race in the series since Keiko Ihara in 2003. Their second entry was prepared by Mooncraft Engineering, and began the season as car number 20 with Hideki Noda as their ace driver alongside Michael Kim.
 JLOC entered two new Lamborghini Gallardo GT3s, the number 88 driven by Manabu Orido and Takayuki Aoki, and the number 87 driven by Koji Yamanishi (who rejoined JLOC after a year's absence) and Hideki Yamauchi (who transferred from LMP Motorsport). They also fielded two of their existing Gallardo RG-3 models in multiple races, giving them as many as four entries.
 Former Lexus GT500 driver Takuto Iguchi joined LMP Motorsport after being displaced from Lexus Team SARD.
 Team Taisan consolidated to a single-car effort and changed vehicles to the new Porsche 911 GT3-R (Type 997), in a collaboration with Endless Sports. Kyosuke Mineo was joined by former GT500 class race winner Naoki Yokomizo.
 Team Mach changed vehicles to the latest Ferrari 458 GT3, and gentleman driver Masayuki Ueda joined the team from Gainer.
 Team Art Taste, who debuted in the fifth round of the 2011 season, planned to enter the full 2012 season with a Porsche 911 GT3-R prepared by Cox, and a driver lineup featuring Tim Bergmeister and Takeshi Tsuchiya.
 Dijon Racing entered the series for the first time, fielding the Callaway Corvette Z06.R GT3 for drivers Hiroshi Takamori (who transferred from Hankook KTR) and Shogo Mitsuyama (who transferred from Team Taisan).
 Team SG Changi reincorporated as Team SGC, and eventually returned to the series beginning at the fourth round at Sportsland Sugo, where returning drivers Ryo Orime and Alexandre Imperatori won in 2011 with their Lexus IS 350 GT300.
 ThunderAsia Racing went from a full-season entry, to a one-off entrant in the third round at Sepang Circuit with drivers Fairuz Fauzy and Hiroki Yoshida.

Mid-season Changes

GT500 Class 

 2004 GT500 champion Richard Lyons joined Lexus Team Petronas TOM's for the Fuji GT 500 km Race. Loïc Duval was unavailable, as he was competing in the 6 Hours of Spa-Francorchamps with Audi Sport Team Joest.
 Marino Franchitti replaced André Couto at Lexus Team WedsSport Bandoh for the non-championship Fuji Sprint Cup. Couto was unavailable, as he was competing in the Macau Grand Prix Guia Race.

GT300 Class 

 Team a Speed changed vehicles from the Aston Martin V8 Vantage GT2 to the V12 Vantage GT3 from the second round at Fuji Speedway. The V12 Vantage would go on to win two races in its first season in Japan.
 Tim Bergmeister was seriously injured in a crash during the Fuji 500 km, and Team Art Taste withdrew from all remaining rounds after their car was totalled in the accident. Takeshi Tsuchiya would go on to replace Haruki Kurosawa at Green Tec & LEON with Shift for the sixth round at Fuji Speedway, after Kurosawa was injured in a crash at the Suzuka 1000 km.
 NDDP prospect Daiki Sasaki replaced Yuhi Sekiguchi in the sixth round at Fuji Speedway. Sekiguchi was suspended for one race due to penalty points accrued under Super GT's Driving Moral Hazard System.
 Tomei Sports began the season with drivers Atsushi Tanaka and Yasushi Kikuchi, but Kikuchi was replaced from round two by rookie Takuya Shirasaka.
 Naoya Yamano replaced Alexandre Imperatori at Team SGC for the final two championship races and the Fuji Sprint Cup.
 JLOC's two Gallardo RG-3s changed drivers throughout the season. The number 86 car ran the first five rounds with Hideshi Matsuda and Junichiro Yamashita. Matsuda was then moved to the number 85 car in the seventh round at Autopolis, partnering Yuya Sakamoto (of Iwate Prefecture). Sakamoto had previously shared driving duties with Masaki Kano and Ryohei Sakaguchi in five of the previous six rounds. Neither of these cars entered the eighth round at Motegi, but the 86 car returned for the Fuji Sprint Cup with Matsuda and Yamashita as its drivers, and Sakamoto replaced Hideki Yamauchi in the number 87 Gallardo GT3 for the Fuji Sprint Cup.
 Hitotsuyama Racing's number 21 car brought on Richard Lyons as a third driver for the Suzuka 1000 km, and Lyons would replace Cyndie Allemann on a permanent basis for the rest of the season. Meanwhile, their second entry prepared by Mooncraft underwent numerous changes during the season: Hideki Noda left the team after two races, and was replaced with reigning Porsche Carrera Cup Japan champion Hideto Yasuoka. Frank Yu replaced Michael Kim for rounds two and three, before Kim returned for rounds four and five - by which point, the car changed its number to 99. After a one-race absence, the car returned as number 77, driven by Yu and Yasuoka in round seven, then by Ukrainian-American driver Igor Sushko and Kenji Kobayashi in round eight and the Fuji Sprint Cup.
 Third drivers entered for the Fuji 500 km included Jörg Bergmeister (Team Art Taste), Yukinori Taniguchi (Hitotsuyama Racing #21), Keiichi Inoue (Dijon Racing), and Masataka Kawaguchi (Team Mach). Third drivers entered for the Suzuka 1000 km included Inoue, Lyons, Daiki Sasaki, Yuichi Nakayama (apr #31), Akihiko Nakaya (Green Tec & LEON with Shift), Atsushi Yogo (Gainer), Keita Sawa (JLOC #88), Hiroshi Hamaguchi (Cars Tokai Dream28), Yoshio Tsuzuki (Hitotsuyama Racing #21), Kenji Kobayashi (apr #30), and Hiroki Yoshida, who was part of the class-winning Team a Speed, but did not drive during the race itself and received no championship points.

Calendar

Standings

GT500 Drivers
Scoring system

GT300 Drivers
Scoring system

JAF Grand Prix

GT500 Drivers

GT300 Drivers

References

External links
Super GT official website 

2012
 
Super GT